Paul Fleming (born 3 April 1988) is an Australian professional boxer from Tully, Queensland who fought at the 2008 Olympics at featherweight. He was an Australian Institute of Sport scholarship holder.

The tattooed concreter won Bronze at the World Junior Championships in 2006 when he lost to Vyacheslav Shipunov.

The 19-year-old Fleming had lost three times to long-time rival Luke Jackson but managed to defeat him and Taga Samueli Faialaga at the Oceanian Championships where he won his berth in the Olympic tournament. He later added the Chemistry Cup in Germany.

At the 2008 Summer Olympics he was edged out 9:13 by Frenchman Khedafi Djelkhir.

On 29 November 2008, Paul made his professional debut against veteran Shane Green scoring a 3rd-round TKO victory in the 6 round bout at the Maroochydore Rugby League Club, Queensland.

In 2010, the young Australian relocated to Sydney, to train with one of the countries World Champion trainers Billy Hussein at Bodypunch Boxing Gym. Under the guidance of Hussein, Paul was successful in his 4th professional bout against 25-year-old Kane Buckley scoring a 4th-round KO.

Paul has since compiled a professional record of 26–0, with 17 knockouts. He has not fought professional since a 2018 decision victory over Panya Uthok.

He is recognized in the Australian Olympic Committee list of Australian Indigenous Olympians.
In 2020, the Australian Olympic Committee commissioned Fleming to complete traditional indigenous artworks. These works will appear on the official towels of all Australian athletes at the Tokyo Olympics.

References

External links

Fleming title sees Olympic selection
World Junior 2006
Oceanian Championships 2008
Official site
Professional Boxing Record

Featherweight boxers
Boxers at the 2008 Summer Olympics
1988 births
Living people
People from Far North Queensland
Olympic boxers of Australia
Indigenous Australian boxers
Australian Institute of Sport boxers
Indigenous Australian Olympians
Australian male boxers